The Interceptor, also known as the Mohafiz-IV locally; is a 4×4 all-terrain armoured security vehicle jointly developed by Cavalier Group and Heavy Industries Taxila. It is the 4th version of the Mohafiz ASV family.

History 
The Interceptor was first unveiled to the public in 2017 during the IDEC 2017 expo. Since then, it has been displayed at various international exhibitions notably at African and Middle Eastern Expos. In April 2018, Bahrain became the first international customer of the Interceptor after an MoU was signed with Pakistan for 6 units with an option for a further 50 units also available.

Design 
The Interceptor is based on the original LC-79 chassis of a Land Cruiser designed for various security purposes. It is fitted with an upgraded suspension and brake system to handle various types of terrains and weight with good maneuverability. The hull armour depends upon the customer's request which can either be fitted with B-6 or B-7 level armour protection along with B6 level bulletproof glass that can protect against standard and armour piercing 7.62 NATO bullets. The vehicle can seat 8 people including a commander and driver. Moreover, the ASV features run-flat tires which can go up to  deflated depending upon the speed and terrain. Other than that it has a turret which can be fitted with a 7.62 mm machine gun like the MG-3 and 7 firing ports in case of combat situations. Life support equipment is also available which includes a Temperature control unit and a ventilation system.

Operators 

6 units in service with the National Guard of Bahrain An option for 40-50 more is also available upon customer's request in accordance to the 2018 deal.

Many units in service with several law enforcement agencies

References 

Armoured fighting vehicles of Pakistan